Urszula Radwańska is the defending champion, having won the event in 2012, but chose not to defend her title.

Petra Martić won the title, defeating Karolína Plíšková in the final, 6–3, 6–3.

Seeds

Main draw

Finals

Top half

Bottom half

References 
 Main draw

Aegon Trophy - Women's Singles
2013 Women's Singles